Marvin Rolle (born 15 November 1983) is a professional male tennis player from The Bahamas.

Rolle reached his highest individual ranking on the ATP Tour on 13 September 2010, when he became World number 1304.  He primarily plays on the Futures circuit.

Rolle is a member of the Bahamian Davis Cup team, having posted a 14–15 record in singles and a 23–17 record in doubles in fifty-one ties played since 2001.

Rolle has represented The Bahamas in multiple international competitions.  Rolle partnered with countryman Devin Mullings in the men's doubles competition at the 2010 Central American and Caribbean Games, winning the bronze medal.  Rolle also represented The Bahamas at the 2010 Commonwealth Games and the 2007 and 2011 Pan American Games.

Doubles titles (2)

External links

1983 births
Living people
Bahamian male tennis players
Tennis players at the 2007 Pan American Games
Tennis players at the 2011 Pan American Games
Tennis players at the 2010 Commonwealth Games
Pan American Games competitors for the Bahamas
Commonwealth Games competitors for the Bahamas
Sportspeople from Nassau, Bahamas
Central American and Caribbean Games bronze medalists for the Bahamas
Competitors at the 2010 Central American and Caribbean Games
Central American and Caribbean Games medalists in tennis